Barbara Louise Chilvers is a New Zealand marine biologist who researches marine mammals. She is Professor of Wildlife Ecology in the School of Veterinary Science at Massey University and Director of Wildbase Oiled Wildlife Response at the university.

Academic career 
Chilvers graduated with a Bachelor of Agricultural Science from Lincoln University in 1994. She moved to James Cook University in Townsville, Queensland to study for a PhD which she completed in 2002. Her thesis was titled "Behavioural ecology of bottlenose dolphins, Tursiops aduncus, in S.E. Queensland, Australia: Adaptations to ecological and anthropogenic influences".

Returning to New Zealand, Chilvers joined Massey University where she was appointed full professor with effect from 1 January 2019.

Selected works

References

External links 

 
 
 

Living people
Year of birth missing (living people)
New Zealand marine biologists
New Zealand women scientists
New Zealand women academics
James Cook University alumni
Academic staff of the Massey University